William Raines Battle III (born December 8, 1941) is an American former college athletics administrator and football coach.  He was the athletic director of the University of Alabama from 2013 to 2017.  He was appointed by University President Judy L. Bonner and approved by the board of trustees March 22, 2013.  He succeeded long-time director Mal Moore, who stepped down for health reasons at age 73.

Career
Battle was formerly a licensing executive and a college football player and coach.  He was the head football coach at the University of Tennessee from 1970 to 1976.  At the time he began as head coach, he was at 29 the youngest college head coach in the country.  A native of Birmingham, Alabama and a graduate of the University of Alabama, Battle was one of many of Bear Bryant's former players and assistant coaches who would later become head coaches.

Despite a 59–22–2 record in seven seasons in Knoxville in an era in which Alabama dominated the Southeastern Conference and annually contended for the national championship, Battle was forced out after the 1976 season, allowing Volunteer legend Johnny Majors to return to his alma mater after leading Pittsburgh to the 1976 national championship.

Battle is the founder and chairman of The Collegiate Licensing Company (CLC). In 1981, while working for Golden Eagle Enterprises in Selma, Alabama, Battle signed Paul "Bear" Bryant to a licensing agreement. The University of Alabama signed on as CLC's first university client. In 1983, Battle moved the newly formed company to Atlanta, Georgia.

Battle is also a member of the group that votes in the Harris Interactive College Football Poll.

Personal life
Battle was born in Birmingham, Alabama. Battle's father, William Raines "Bill" Battle Jr., was athletic director at Birmingham–Southern College from 1952 to 1974. His grandfather William Raines Battle was a Methodist minister. Battle was also inducted into Omicron Delta Kappa - the National Leadership Honor Society at the University of Alabama in 1962.

Head coaching record

References

1941 births
Living people
American football ends
Alabama Crimson Tide athletic directors
Alabama Crimson Tide football players
Army Black Knights football coaches
Tennessee Volunteers football coaches
Sportspeople from Birmingham, Alabama
Players of American football from Birmingham, Alabama